The 2012 Ingersoll Clash was held from September 28 to 30 at the Ingersoll & District Curling Club  in Ingersoll, Ontario, as part of the 2012–13 Ontario Curling Tour. The men's and women's events were held in a round robin format. The purse for the men's event were CAD$10,500, and CAD $6,000 for the women's event.

Men

Teams

Round-robin standings

Playoffs

Women

Teams

Round-robin standings

Playoffs

External links

Ingersoll Clash
Ingersoll, Ontario